The Research Society on Alcoholism (RSA) is a learned society of over 1600 active members based in Austin, Texas. Its objective is to advance research on alcoholism and the physiological and cognitive effects of alcohol. The RSA holds an annual meeting and, together with the International Society for Biomedical Research on Alcoholism, sponsors the publication of Alcoholism: Clinical and Experimental Research, published by Wiley-Blackwell.

RSA holds yearly elections for Vice President, Secretary and five Board Member positions.

Current and Past Presidents

References

External links 
 

Scientific societies based in the United States
Alcohol abuse in the United States
Addiction organizations in the United States